Bid-e Estakhr (also Romanized as Bīd-e Estakhr) is a village in Soghan Rural District, Soghan District, Arzuiyeh County, Kerman Province, Iran. At the 2006 census, its population was 51, in 14 families.

References 

Populated places in Arzuiyeh County